La Gran Sabana is a region in southeastern Venezuela, part of the Guianan savanna ecoregion. 

The savanna spreads into the regions of the Guiana Highlands and south-east into Bolívar State, extending further to the borders with Brazil and Guyana. Only Parima Tapirapecó National Park is larger than Canaima. The average temperature is around 20 °C (68 °F), but at night can drop to 13 °C (55 °F) and in some of the more elevated sites, depending on weather, may drop a bit more.

The location offers one of the most unusual landscapes in the world, with rivers, waterfalls and gorges, deep and vast valleys, impenetrable jungles and savannahs that host large numbers and varieties of plant species, a diverse fauna and the isolated table-top mesas locally known as tepuis.

History

During the time of the Colonial Venezuela, the extent of the territories of Guiana and its natural resources gave rise to the legend of El Dorado, which caught the attention of adventurers, explorers and settlers. They eventually came to these shores in search of gold, gems and other valuable products. Thus began the exploration of a territory so vast and difficult to access, that to date the territory has several areas that very few people have seen.

Park creation
Due to the richness and diversity, both biological and mineral and geographical of the Southeast Guayana, was necessary to protect the territory by the Government of Venezuela. For this reason, Canaima was declared a National Park, many years later by Executive Order No. 770 dated June 12, 1962. The park is the second largest in Venezuela.

It was enlarged in 1975 to cover several points of high ecological importance. Among those sites are the Carrao River Basin, the headwaters of the Caroní River, the Sierra de Lema, the source of the Cuyuni River and the rolling plains, which form the Gran Sabana.

Currently, the Gran Sabana remains a place of high ecological value. UNESCO, proclaimed Canaima National Park a World Heritage Site in 1994. It is a place of high value to the Venezuela government, which promotes conservation and exploration, and to the people of Venezuela. Thousands of tourists visit the place every year. They can enjoy the variety of natural wonders in the park and delight both for the beauty of its places of interest including the landscapes of the tepuis, waterfalls and streams), and its diversity of fauna and flora. The latter attract many scholars and scientists from around the world. Only in the Gran Sabana is 40% of the species of Venezuela, and 23% in terms of reptiles and amphibians, with many endemic species.

The largest city in the area is Santa Elena de Uairén, which has experienced very rapid growth, with a population of over 30,000 inhabitants. It was founded in 1923 by Lucas Fernández Peña, attracted by the growth of diamond production in the area. The total population of the Gran Sabana is currently estimated at about 48,000.

Geology 
The Gran Sabana formed atop the Precambrian Guyana Shield, with the bedrock consisting of the Roraima Group, presumed to be 1.8-1.4 Ga in age. Within this Group is the resistant Mataui Formation, which forms the tepui cliffs and summits. The low area surrounding the table mountains is Wonkén Planation Surface. The Auyán-Tepui Planation Surface forms the quartzite tepui summits. High precipitation combined with the long period of weathering has produced quartz and sandstone karst features. These include arches, towers, tower fields, dolines, collapse shafts, polje, corridors, grikes, and large cave systems extending many kilometers in length. Some portions of the summits have been described as Ruinform, meaning landscapes resembling ancient ruins.

Geography
This region was subjected to several periods of uplift and subsidence and were subjected to variable erosion. The large remaining isolated sandstone beds are called "tepuis" in the language of the indigenous inhabitants of the region. The formation of rocky and sandy soils support a savanna vegetation on the higher elevations with dense jungle vegetation occurs in depressions and dense forests along the rivers.

Hydrography
La Gran Sabana, and the rest of Venezuela in general, is rich in river networks. The main drainage sub-basins are formed by the rivers Yuruaní, Aponwao, Kukenán, Suruku, Ikabarú, Karuay, Urimán and Antabare.

The vast majority of rivers and streams in the region are of dark waters, with coloration similar to that of tea. The waters are very poor in dissolved nutrients and rich in humic acids and tannins, which give them its characteristic brown color. The acidity is quite high, reaching pH of 3-4.

Tepuis 

In the Gran Sabana, there are randomly distributed ancient massifs eroded in tabular form, known as tepuis. These are examples of inverted relief, which form a kind of typical plateau of the Guiana highlands.

Auyantepui

Although the Auyantepui is not part of the Gran Sabana as the exact delimitation of the territory, it is considered by many to be part of it, being the most famous tepui throughout Guiana. It is in the Canaima Northwest and is one of the most recognized tepuis in the world, because it comes from the highest waterfall in the world, the Angel Falls (named for the local indigenous "Karepacupai-merú") with an almost  freefall.

These Falls were first made known to non-indigenous people by the U.S. born explorer-aviator Jimmy Angel in 1937. He attempted to land his plane on top of Auyantepui, crashing (without fatalities) in one of his expeditions.

It is possible to access the southern part of Auyantepui and climb it. In some sections of the trip it is necessary to use ropes to climb, although the difficulty level is not high. To make the ascent to the tepui is necessary to reach the village of Kavak by plane or helicopter, as there is no vehicle access routes to the tepui.

Chimantá Massif

The Chimantá Massif is the formation of plateaus (10 in total, among which Amurí, Churí, and Akopán-tepui) and is the largest in Venezuela, with its . The tepui is not easily accessible, and is not visited by tourists. It is in the central-western Canaima. From this observation had two expeditions, one of which found the same Brewer Carías, among many other innovations a new species of frog, named in his honor Colostethus breweri.

Mount Roraima

Mount Roraima is the highest tepui of the National Park. It is also known as Blue Mountain or Crystal Mountain, and is considered by the local indigenous population as a divinity. The Pemon believe that most tepuis host powerful spirits or entities to which they respect and fear. Some of them even make offerings and prayers at the top in their infrequent visits to the tepui (usually as tour guides in exchange for money and/or food).

Despite this, over this wall, it is an outstanding area, with tilt and space for tourists to climb to the top. Among the attractions are the Valley of the Crystals (a deposit of quartz formations), the Jacuzzi area (where water wells of greenish-yellow color), the viewpoints of La Ventana and El Abismo, the North Mazes, la Proa, Lake Gladys, and the "Triple Point". This point is in the northeast of the tepui, and is the place where it meets the border between Brazil, Venezuela and Guyana. They are also very attractive rock formations eroded by wind, leading to myriad interpretations of figures, as the formations of the "flying turtle", the "Mexican hat", the "monkey eating an ice cream cone," or the "elephant", shown in the image.

Kukenan (Matawi-tepui)
Incorrectly named and widely known as Kukenan-tepui, this plateau is in reality known as Matawi-tepui. The second ascent was not till 1972 by Stephen Platt, Ramon Blanco, Hans Swartz and Ambrosio Perez. The Matawi-Tepui chain belongs to the eastern tepuis of the Gran Sabana, along with the Yuruani-tepui. It is also the location of Kukenan Falls listed as the tenth highest waterfall in the world with its  of free fall.

Other tepuis
Other recognized tepuis are in the chain Ilú-Tramén-Karaurín, as well as the Wadaka-piapó (or Wadakapiapü) and the Yuruaní, which together with the Kukenan and Roraima, in the chain of the 7 eastern tepuis. These also highlight the tepuis Iglú-tepui, Ptarí-tepui, Acopán-tepui and the Sororopán-tepui, which has a tilt feature, and can be climbed.

Tramen Tepui (2,700 m) in the Ilú–Tramen Massif, was first climbed by Scharlie Wraight and Stephen Platt from the col between Ilu Tepui and Tramen Tepui on 24 November 1981.

There are a large number of minor tepuis, however, which can be found tepuis the whole of Canaima, the total of these around 150. Most tepuis reach heights ranging between 2,000 and 2,700 m.

Climate

Temperature

However, due to rainfall, which abounds throughout the year, and therefore its cloud cover, the average annual temperature is lower, with daily temperature variations. Minimum temperatures rarely drop below  (unless it is on top of the tepuis, which are exposed, such as Roraima, overnight). Usually, the maximum temperature does not exceed .

Precipitation

Winds
Visitors to the Gran Sabana may notice strong winds to finish up the area of La Escalera and see for first time large areas of savannah. Compared to the average weather of Venezuela, the site moved relatively favorable and cool winds, creating a comfortable feeling. Climate variation is determined by altitude and winds, as the latitude (between 4 ° and 8 ° latitude north) of the site falls within the equatorial belt. The area further north in its lower part is subject to the influence of winds from the east and northeast, resulting in a rainy season and drought season. The south by contrast, is affected by wet winds from the Amazon depression and Southeast, which condense when in contact with elevations, producing heavy rains.

Flora and vegetation
The savannas occupy undisputed first place in the diverse range of ecosystems that developed in the region. But the Gran Sabana includes a variety of scenarios, subject to a complex mix of climatic and ecological conditions ranging from hot lowlands to the high cold mountains. It thus has developed a considerable number of plant species adapted to its ecosystems. The vegetation is characterized as particular to the region and based on very acidic soils derived from the decomposition of the sandstones.

The savannas and gallery forests are situated along the courses of rivers and streams that traverse the savannahs. These forests have a very varied vegetation where there are trees, shrubs, guacos, epiphytes and the Moriche Palm. Its leaves are mostly thick, probably due to the soil's acidity and lack of nutrients. La Gran Sabana has a variety of grasses. As the ground has many rocks and is sandy, the grasses are unsuitable for feeding  livestock. The most important plant families are Theaceae, Humiriaceae, Ericaceae, Compositae, Aquifoliaceae, Burseraceae, and Sapotaceae.

In the turbulent rivers and  waterfalls, plants that grow on the rocks have peculiar carpets that are green or tan. These are Spermatophyte plants of the family Podostemaceae. These form dense communities of medium to high altitudes, with undergrowth closed, sometimes with many epiphytes. At the summit of the Auyantepui and the Massif Chimantá there are several kinds of plants that do not grow anywhere else in the world, such as the genera Brocchinia (family Bromeliaceae), Tepuia (Ericaceae), Mallophyton (Melastomataceae), Coryphothamnus and Aphanocarpus (Rubiaceae), and finally Arimantaea and Achnopogon (Asteraceae). Many of the rarest species are found on exposed sandstone formations open. Furthermore, in shady and protected beneath the rocks and small cavities, are achieved endemic ferns of the genus Hymenophyllopsis and Pterozonium. 

The flora has been one of the most important attractions for botanical studies. insectivorous plant communities belonging to the genera Heliamphora, Drosera and Utricularia have been found. These live in the thin layer of soil resting directly on the bedrock.

Fauna
Despite the enormous variety of species living in the Gran Sabana, is not common for visitors to find animals on the road to El Dorado to Santa Elena de Uairén, because there prevails the open forest, and these animals prefer the islands forest, riparian forests, and jungles that are in the mountains at the foot of the tepuis.

In the Sabana, wildlife species include endangered species like the giant anteater (Myrmecophaga tridactyla), the giant armadillo (Priodontes maximus), the giant Amazon otter (Pteronura brasiliensis), the paca Agouti paca, or Tyler's mouse opossum (Marmosa tyleriana). It also has the Orinoco capuchin monkey (Chiropotes satanas), the howler (Alouatta seniculus) and the widow monkey (Pithecia pithecia). The avifauna is varied, especially the cock of the rock (Rupicola rupicola) and the harpy eagle (Harpia harpyja). Among the reptiles are Boa constrictor, the anaconda (Eunectes murinus) and the pineapple cuaima (Lachesis muta muta). Many species of amphibians live in wet areas, including the mining frog (Dendrobates leucomelas).

Other common species include the armadillo (Dasypus novemcinctus), the small cuspa (Cabassous unicinctus), or capybara (Hydrochoerus hydrochaeris), the largest rodent in the world. Rarely, jaguars (Panthera onca), pumas (Puma concolor), margays (Leopardus wiedii) and ocelots (Leopardus pardalis) can be seen. Other notable wildlife include porcupines (Coendou sp.), kinkajous (Potos flavus) and long-tailed weasels (Neogale frenata), which are generally arboreal. Another interesting mammal is the bush dog(Speothos venaticus), though it is seldom sighted and only present in forests of this region.

Due to the low amount of nutrients and harsh environmental conditions on the tops of the plateaus, the presence of fauna on the tepuis is quite limited.

Ethnic groups

The Pemon are the largest group of indigenous people in the region. They are scattered throughout the Canaima National Park and are divided into three groups: Arekunas, Taurepanes and Kamarakotos. They are the native inhabitants of the Gran Sabana and today many work in the tourism industry, manage and administer inns and serve as guides on expeditions in the region. The number of native inhabitants of la Gran Sabana is not known exactly. However, the population census carried out by INE in 2001 revealed the presence of a total of 42,600 indigenous people statewide in Bolívar, of which the vast majority live in the Gran Sabana.

Languages
The language of almost all the indigenous peoples of the area is the Pemon, a language of
Carib family related to the extinct Caribs, and Tamanaco and Chaimas. Most of them also speak Spanish. However, note that there is a large non-indigenous population that speaks Spanish. In Santa Elena de Uairén, in the area near the Brazilian border, it is common to find people who speak Portuguese.

Towns and communities

Santa Elena de Uairén

As already mentioned, the main town is Santa Elena de Uairén, which is also the capital of the Gran Sabana Municipality. The city's name originated in the first daughter of the founder, Lucas Fernández Peña, called "Elena", and on the river that crosses the city, the "Uairén". It has an airport, a military post and is a free port from 1999, organized and founded by the son of the founder, Professor Héctor Fernández Espinoza. Its economy is based on trade and mining.

Recently, the tourism sector has been an important development because of its proximity to the main natural features of the Gran Sabana and its location near the border. The city has had a rapid population growth during the last decade and it is estimated that by 2016 the population of the town will be around 55,000. Several hotels that are involved in tourism with limited resources are spread through the center of the city. The Hotel Gran Sabana is a luxury option, like the Hotel Anaconda. In the center of the city, tourists can find many shops where they can buy supplies for camping in the national park, from canned or fresh food, to spare normal camping equipment. Many are also the business of buying and selling gold in the village.

Kavanayén

Kavanayén (Santa Teresita de Kavanayén) is an indigenous village inhabited mainly by the Pemon people. Currently it is estimated that about 30,000 people live in the town. It is in the boundaries of Canaima National Park in the Gran Sabana Municipality, in the Upper Caroní River. The Capuchin missionaries founded the town of Kavanayén in 1943. The buildings of the town are built with the technique developed by missionaries with stone taken from the area. One of the most important architectural attractions of the community is the Shrine of Santa Teresita de Kavanayén, but it has other buildings of significant size and importance, such as a presidential residence where visiting presidents can stay for short periods, a beacon station, and a generating turbine for hydroelectric power.

El Paují
In El Paují the streets are not paved. Has power, but the build system is switched off shortly before midnight. Almost all households have its own generating plant. No cell phone service or coverage, but there is a communications center which it can access the internet. The community also has an airstrip, medications, a rescue group and a school. For tourists there are inns and eating places. In the community living around 500 people, many of them professionals and retirees. Among them there are craftsmen, adventurers, miners, beekeepers.

San Francisco de Yuruaní (Kumaracapai)

San Francisco de Yuruaní, an indigenous community in the "km 250" of the Troncal 10 is an important craft selling place, and offers refueling for tourists. The name in the native language of the community is Kumarakapay. The town offers various items of tourist tat, including bracelets and necklaces. Tourists can find there a large sample of mineral stones common in Bolivar state, as auriferous quartz, rose quartz, slate, iron, marble, bauxite, silicon, jet and ruffe, among others. In the restaurants of the community can sample typical foods. The small town has several services, including lodging, groceries, restaurants, and health supplies. It is also possible to organize trips and excursions to other parts of Canaima National Park.

Other communities
Among other less important communities may be mentioned San Rafael de Kamoirán, where are the Rapids Kamoirán, Wönken, known for its Capuchin missions, Paraitepuy of Roraima, where the walk starts normally to the tepui, and Iboriwo or Liwöriwö, where visitors can camp and visit the Aponwao Falls. Other sites closer to the Canaima area include Kavak, Kamarata, Pupurken, Guayaraca and Uruyén. These communities offer the possibility to the visitors of trekking in the area, or climbing Auyantepui being the pemones guides with extensive knowledge of the area.

Tourism

Access and movement in la Gran Sabana

To reach the Gran Sabana is necessary to pass the paved road (called Troncal 10) passing through Ciudad Guayana and reaches the Brazilian border. Just before arriving at the Gran Sabana is to pass the said place called La Escalera, an uphill road with several curves and immersed in a typically rainy and foggy forest. Once past that section there is a paved road that runs through the Gran Sabana. There are other ways to access other sites, but are not paved.

Tourists can also take a plane to Santa Elena de Uairén. Currently bus service exists between Ciudad Guayana and Santa Elena de Uairén, but car travel is recommended to allow for frequent stops in interesting places. The journey from Caracas is usually done in two days.

Some of the most attractive places can be reached only by four wheel drive vehicles. Such is the case in places like Torón and Toroncito, Rapids Sakaika, Rapids Anaway, Rapids Käk, the town of Paraitepuy de Roraima, and several sites of interest in the way to Ikabarú.

To reach the town of Kavak, where the gorge of the river of that name, it is essential to travel by air. In the second half of 2011, however, vehicles were banned from some of the unpaved roads, such as at the River Torón. This measure was taken by the Government, because the soil condition was badly damaged by the passage of four wheel drive vehicles. The most important falls, and easier access on the main road, that can be reached without four wheel drive vehicles are the Falls Kama or "Kama-Merú" in Pemon language, Falls Pacheco or "Arapan-Merú" and Jasper Creek or "Kako Paru".

Another issue to consider traveling in the Gran Sabana is the supply of gasoline. There are few suppliers of fuel, and not every one is always open. For foreign tourists the fuel supply is not guaranteed, because the government guarantees gasoline only for Venezuelans. There is also differentiation of supply for Venezuelan tourists and locals, due to smuggling of gasoline in Brazil has a much higher value than in Venezuela. The same problem of illegal purchase and sale of gasoline is before the entrance to the Gran Sabana, the Venezuelan side, in the town of San Isidro, also known as "Km 88".

Visitors can lose hours to fill a vehicle fuel in high season. Because of these difficulties, it is recommended that tourists carry pimpinas or drums, properly identified with the red color for safety and security reasons.

Some tranches can be done in "curiaras", which are boats carved in wood, manned by local people. Despite being managed by pemones, these boats may have engines to reduce travel time. To get to the falls, visitors must travel by car to the camp Liwöriwö by dirt roads, and then take the curiara guided by Indigenous (a journey of about 20 minutes) until the fall.

Another popular tourist activity, albeit at a price making it somewhat less accessible, is to fly by helicopter or plane. Visitors can take flights from many places, however, the most common is to take off from Santa Elena de Uairén, where there are local agencies. Some plans include tours on tepuis Roraima and Kukenan, visits to waterfalls, overlooking Auyantepuy with overflight of Angel Falls and camp visits of Canaima, to places which is not accessible by vehicle.

Sites of interest 

 Falls Aponwao (Chinak-meru)
 Falls Kamá (Kamá Meru)
 Falls Kamá (Kamá Mesalto)
 Falls Kawi (Kawí merú)
 Falls Kukenan
 Falls Yuruaní
 Falls Karuay
 Km "88"
 La Laja
 El Paují
 El Abismo
 Santa Elena de Uairén
 Mission of Kavanayén

Photo gallery

References

External links

  
 https://web.archive.org/web/20100829190824/http://lagransabana.travel/en
 http://www.advrider.com/forums/showthread.php?t=284936
 http://www.venezuelatuya.com/gransabana/indexeng.htm
 https://web.archive.org/web/20120915101241/https://web.archive.org/web/20120915101241/http://www.inparques.gob.ve/ (in Spanish)

Regions of South America
Geography of Venezuela
Geography of Bolívar (state)
Guianan savanna